Placidochromis hennydaviesae is a species of cichlid endemic to Lake Malawi where it is only known from the southern portions of the lake. This species can reach a length of  TL.

Etymology
The specific name honours Henny Davies, the spouse of Peter Davies who was an exporter of fish from Lake Malawi.

References

hennydaviesae
Fish of Lake Malawi
Fish of Malawi
Fish described in 1973
Taxa named by Warren E. Burgess
Taxa named by Herbert R. Axelrod
Taxonomy articles created by Polbot